One More Time is an album by American country music singer Eddy Arnold. It was released in April 1962 by RCA Victor (catalog no. LPM-2471). The album is a "collection of songs he made famous the first time around."

Critical reception
The Rolling Stone Album Guide called the album "a set of personable mood music with bluesier intent than most of the artist's recordings," writing that it "shows the singer at his soothing best."

Track listing
Side A
 "One Grain of Sand" [2:38]
 "That Do Make It Nice" (Eddy Arnold, Fred Ebb, P. Klein) [2:06]
 "The Kentuckian Song" (Irving Gordon) [2:30]
 "This Is the Thanks I Get (For Loving You)" (Thomas Dilbeck) [2:00]
 "What a Fool I Was" (Stu Davis) [2:32]
 "Just Out of Reach (Of My Two Open Arms)" (Virgil F. Stewart) [2:39]

Side B
 "The Richest Man (In the World)" [2:39]
 "I'm Throwing Rice (At The Girl That I Love)" (Eddy Arnold, Steve Nelson) [2:15]
 "Then I Turned and Walked Slowly Away" (Red Fortner) [2:42]
 "Just Call Me Lonesome" (Rex Griffin) [2:21]
 "I'd Trade All of My Tomorrows (For Just One Yesterday)" (Jenny Carson) [2:10]
 "Don't Rob Another Man's Castle" (Jenny Carson) [2:35]

References

1962 albums
RCA Victor albums
Eddy Arnold albums